Wolfurt is a municipality in the western Austrian state of Vorarlberg.

Population

References

External links
 Municipal home page

Cities and towns in Bregenz District